Francis James Rosso (March 1, 1921 – January 26, 1980) was a Major League Baseball (MLB) pitcher who pitched in two games for the New York Giants in 1944. He played in the minor leagues between 1939 and 1948, and after his playing career was a high school coach.

With a 0–0 record, Rosso sported a 9.00 ERA pitching for a total of 4 innings over 2 games. Bucky Walters of the Cincinnati Reds hold the distinction of being the only player Rosso struck out. Rosso was used as a pinch runner in his final MLB appearance.

References

External links

Major League Baseball pitchers
New York Giants (NL) players
Salisbury Senators players
Springfield Rifles players
Jersey City Giants players
San Francisco Seals (baseball) players
Chattanooga Lookouts players
Baseball players from Massachusetts
1921 births
1980 deaths
People from Agawam, Massachusetts